Piero Gibellino (29 March 1926 – 5 July 2003) was an Italian professional football player.

References

1926 births
2003 deaths
Italian footballers
Serie A players
Juventus F.C. players
Association football defenders
People from Gattinara
Footballers from Piedmont
Sportspeople from the Province of Vercelli